Microlophus delanonis, the Española lava lizard or Hood lava lizard,  is endemic to the Galapagos island of Española. The species is commonly attributed to the genus Microlophus but has been attributed to the genus Tropidurus.

References

External links

delanonis
Endemic reptiles of the Galápagos Islands
Lizards of South America
Reptiles of Ecuador
Reptiles described in 1890
Taxa named by Georg Baur